Pericalymma spongiocaule is a plant species of the family Myrtaceae endemic to Western Australia.

It blooms between October and January producing white-pink flowers.

It is found adjacent to sites with permanent water in the Peel, South West and Great Southern regions of Western Australia where it grows in sandy peaty soils over gravel.

References

spongiocaule
Flora of Western Australia
Plants described in 1999